Hangyakuji (The Conspirator) is a 1961 Japanese historical-fiction film directed by Daisuke Ito. It features Kinnosuke Yorozuya, Kaneko Iwasaki, and Tsukie Matsuura.

Plot 
Saburo Nobuyasu, a young king, has trouble finding happiness and comfort. He feels more upset when he is set for an arranged marriage with Tokuhime, who is the daughter of Saburo's worst enemy, Oda Nobunaga. He feels even worse when due to his mother, who is very manipulative to him.

Cast
 Kinnosuke Nakamura as Saburō NObuyasu
 Ryosuke Kagawa as Ōkubo Tadayo
 Haruko Sugimura as Tsukiyama
 Chiyonosuke Azuma as Hattori Haznō
 Ryūnosuke Tsukigata as Oda Nobunaga

Background 
The movie is loosely based on The Battle of Okehazama.

References 

1961 films
Japanese historical films
1960s Japanese films